Razzmatazz (also known as Razz) is a nightclub and concert hall in the Poblenou neighbourhood in Barcelona, Spain. It is one of the city's biggest with a capacity of over 2,000 people in its main hall. The club is formed of five halls where different genres of music are played even though the most played are indie pop, electronic and pop music. Razzmatazz is the "evolution" of the Sala Zeleste, which closed back in 2000 due to its economic debt with the Social Security.

The club is named after the song "Razzmatazz" by Pulp. The Flaming Lips were the first artist to play the venue.

History 
In 1986, the historical Sala Zeleste at Carrer Platería was closed to open a new and much larger one at the Carrer Almogàvers in Poblenou. The new Sala Zeleste is located in the space previously occupied by two carpet and stamped factories. Then it maintains the appearance of a factory or loft, with three clear and very large rooms that can reach more than 3,000 people in total. The main hall had a capacity of 2,000 people, which turned Zeleste into one of the few major concert halls in Barcelona (without reaching the macro-concerts that can be done in the stadium, for example) and that therefore It offered the possibility of hosting concerts of highly successful formations. Some of those that have happened are Paul McCartney, Yoko Ono, James Taylor, Oasis, Europe, The Offspring, PJ Harvey, Tricky, Sugarcubes, Björk, Siouxie, Bauhaus, Juan Luis Guerra, Els Pets, Sopa de Cabra, Blur, Radiohead, Sangtraït, Phish etc.

In the year 2000 the Sala Zeleste had a debt of about €780,000 with the Social Security plus a fairly small debt, of some € 36,000, for rent, but sufficient to do them outside the premises. In the same year 2000, the room was renewed with new owners, a few cosmetic changes and a new name: the new Razzmatazz room was founded.

References 

Concert halls in Spain